Reuben Louis Goodstein (15 December 1912 – 8 March 1985) was an English mathematician with a strong interest in the philosophy and teaching of mathematics.

Education
Goodstein was educated at St Paul's School in London. He received his Master's degree from Magdalene College, Cambridge. After this, he worked at the University of Reading but ultimately spent most of his academic career at the University of Leicester. He earned his PhD from the University of London in 1946 while still working in Reading.

Goodstein also studied under Ludwig Wittgenstein.

Research
He published many works on finitism and the reconstruction of analysis from a finitistic viewpoint, for example "Constructive Formalism. Essays on the foundations of mathematics." Goodstein's theorem was among the earliest examples of theorems found to be unprovable in Peano arithmetic but provable in stronger logical systems (such as second-order arithmetic). He also introduced a variant of the Ackermann function that is now known as the hyperoperation sequence, together with the naming convention now used for these operations (tetration, pentation, hexation, etc.).

Besides mathematical logic (in which he held the first professorial chair in the U.K.), mathematical analysis, and the philosophy of mathematics, Goodstein was keenly interested in the teaching of mathematics. From 1956 to 1962 he was editor of The Mathematical Gazette. In 1962 he was an invited speaker at the International Congress of Mathematicians (with an address on A recursive lattice) in Stockholm. Among his doctoral students are Martin Löb and Alan Bundy.

Publications
 Fundamental concepts of mathematics, Pergamon Press, 1962, 2nd edn. 1979
 Essays in the philosophy of mathematics, Leicester University Press 1965
 Recursive Analysis, North Holland 1961, Dover 2010
 Mathematical Logic, Leicester University Press 1957
 Development of mathematical logic, London, Logos Press 1971
 Complex functions, McGraw Hill 1965
 Boolean Algebra, Pergamon Press 1963, Dover 2007
 Recursive number theory - a development of recursive arithmetic in a logic-free equation calculus, North Holland 1957
 Constructive formalism - essays on the foundations of mathematics, Leicester University College 1951
 with E. J. F. Primrose: Axiomatic projective geometry, Leicester University College 1953

References

English mathematicians
1912 births
1985 deaths
People educated at St Paul's School, London
Alumni of the University of London
Academics of the University of Reading
Academics of the University of Leicester
20th-century British mathematicians
Alumni of Magdalene College, Cambridge